Niccolò Frangipane (active 1565–97) was an Italian artist of the late Renaissance period.

Life
Frangipane was born in Padua. He executed a number of sacred subjects, but was more successful in mythological scenes, particularly the legends of Bacchus. In the church of San Bartolomeo in Padua is a depiction of St Francis of Assisi (1588); and at Pesaro, an altar-piece in San Stefano in Pesaro. Among his masterworks is an  Assumption, in the church of the Conventuali, at Rimini.

Works

References

Attribution:

External links

16th-century Italian painters
Italian male painters
Painters from Padua
Year of birth missing
Year of death missing